Spilostethus furcula is a species of seed bug in the family Lygaeidae, found in Africa, Europe, and the Middle East.

References

External links

 

Lygaeidae